The Tennity Ice Skating Pavilion (The TIP) is an ice arena in Syracuse, New York.  Named for donors Marilyn and Bill Tennity, the facility opened in October 2000 for the use of Syracuse University students. The facility is the home of Syracuse University's ACHA Division I men's hockey team competing in the Eastern States Collegiate Hockey League, and new NCAA Division I women's program playing in the College Hockey America conference. The Ice Pavilion is also used for intramural hockey and broomball leagues, as well as Syracuse University physical education classes. The new women's hockey team locker room was designed by QPK Design.

The facility features two ice sheets, a regulation NHL sized surface and a  oblong studio rink for ice skating and figure skating.

See also
Syracuse Orange
Syracuse Orange women's ice hockey

References

External links
 Official site

Syracuse Orange women's ice hockey
College ice hockey venues in the United States
Indoor arenas in New York (state)
Sports venues in Syracuse, New York
Syracuse Orange sports venues
Ice hockey in Syracuse, New York
2000 establishments in New York (state)
Sports venues completed in 2000
Indoor ice hockey venues in New York (state)
Figure skating venues in the United States